Evadaithe Nakenti is a 2007 Telugu film directed by V. Samudra and Jeevitha. Rajasekhar plays the lead role. The film was released on 9 February 2007. This film has been dubbed in Tamil with the title Udambu Eppadi Irukku. The film is a remake of the Malayalam film, Lion. The climax scene was remade from the 2004 Tamil film Madurey, starring Vijay in the main lead.

Cast
 Rajasekhar as Major Surya
 Samvrutha Sunil as Priya
 Bhanuchander as Police Officer
 Raghuvaran as Education Minister Bal Gangadhar
 Kalabhavan Mani as Devulapalli Nataraja Kalidas "DNK"
 Krishna Bhagavaan as PK Babu
 Mumaith Khan as Inspector Maisamma
 Giri Babu as Chief Minister
 Devaraj as Chakravarthi
 Raghu Babu as Pidikila Pentayya Dora
 Babu Mohan
 Annapoorna as Surya's mother
 Jhansi as Meena B. Gangadhar
 Narsing Yadav as Narsing
 Kota Srinivasa Rao as Governor
 Prudhvi Raj as Electricity Minister Diwakar
 Chakri as Bullabbayi
 Ranganath
 Bharath Reddy as an eve-teaser
 Surya as Municipal Commissioner
 Gundu Sudarshan as Lawyer
 Tarzan as Tarzan
 Kadambari Kiran as Minister
 Kallu Chidambaram as Kallu Chidambaram
 Gundu Hanumantha Rao as Chief Minister's PA

Music
Music was composed by Chinna.

References

External links

2007 films
2000s Telugu-language films
Telugu remakes of Malayalam films
Indian action thriller films
Indian political thriller films
Films directed by V. Samudra
2007 action thriller films
2000s political thriller films